The Women's singles luge competition at the 1972 Winter Olympics in Sapporo was held from 4 to 7 February, at Sapporo Teine.

Results

References

Luge at the 1972 Winter Olympics
1972 in women's sport